205 – Room of Fear is a 2011 German horror film directed by Rainer Matsutani. It's a remake of the Danish film Room 205. The film stars Jennifer Ulrich. Marie-Alise Recasner recorded an original song for the ending credits as well as performed vocals on the score.

Cast

Release

Box office 
Originally planned for an opening in 2011, the movie was pushed back. After it was questioned to do a theatrical release or rather releasing it direct-to-video, the movie opened in German theaters on 4 April 2013. The film failed to open within the Top 5 of its opening week and grossed €309,172 at the end of its theatrical run. Before the official opening in Germany, 205 - Room of Fear was part of the German films Go North festival and was released on 20 July 2012 in Turkey.

Home media 
205 – Room of Fear will be released in Region 2 on DVD and Blu-ray on 10 October 2013 in Germany. It will be released with an FSK 16 rating.

Reception 
The response to the film has been mixed. Based on twelve reviews collected by moviepilot, 205 – Room of Fear has an average score of 5.0 out of 10. Echo Onlines Dirk Henninger praises the acting and finds the story thrilling, while Near Darks Ash Williams thinks it's finally a "good horror thriller" from Germany, giving 205 – Room of Fear four out of five stars. Spielfilm.de gave the film the score 8 out of 10, enjoying  the focus on Katrin's psyche. Cinetastic gave the film 6 out of 10.

Rajko Burchardt wrote of the scary movie "with East German feel" that while it's honorable to give the German horror film a try, the film failed miserably. Lida Bach of Filmrezension gave the movie another negative review with giving it one out of five stars.

References

External links
 

2011 films
2011 horror films
German horror films
2010s German-language films
Horror film remakes
Remakes of Danish films
2010s German films